The  is an incomplete two-lane national expressway in Kōchi Prefecture. It is owned and operated by the Ministry of Land, Infrastructure, Transport and Tourism (MLIT). The route is signed as an auxiliary route of National Route 55 as well E55 under MLIT's  "2016 Proposal for Realization of Expressway Numbering."

Route description
The speed limit is 80 km/h for the entire route. There is only one lane traveling in each direction along the entirety of the expressway.

History
The existing portions (as of February 2019) of the expressway opened in five phases between March 2011 and April 2016.

Future
The remainder of the route is planned to be opened to traffic in phases between 2021. It is unknown when the section between Kochi Ryoma Airport Interchange and Konan-Noichi Interchange will be completed.

Junction list
The entire expressway is in Kōchi Prefecture.

See also

Japan National Route 55
Kōchi Expressway

References

External links

 Ministry of Land, Infrastructure and Transport: Shikoku Development Bureau

Roads in Kōchi Prefecture
Expressways in Japan